Lee Reherman (July 4, 1966 – March 1, 2016) was an American  actor, appearing in television and film and hosting television reality shows.

Early life
Reherman was born on July 4, 1966, in Louisville, Kentucky. He attended Cornell University, where he played football as an offensive lineman.

Following his graduation with a B.S. in 1988, he attended the Miami Dolphins training camp trying out for the team's offensive line, but did not make the team.

Thereafter, he earned his MBA at the UCLA Anderson School of Management. He was pursuing a doctorate in economics at the University of California-Los Angeles (UCLA), although he left to begin his television and film career.

Professional career
In 1992, Reherman made his first professional acting appearance as an unnamed football player in the television show Columbo. The following year, he had a small named part in the film Last Action Hero, but began creating a name when he joined the American Gladiators television show as "Hawk". He remained with the show until its cancelation in 1996, also appearing from 1995 to 1996 in the spin-offs International Gladiators 1 and International Gladiators 2. Through this time and after, he continued with small spots in television programs and television hosting roles, including a recurring position with the American Veterans Awards on the History Channel.  Reherman reprised his "Hawk" nickname on RollerJam, serving as color commentator.

In 2007, Reherman became the regular host of Hot Rod TV and Forza Motorsport Showdown on the television network Speed. He hosted Forza Motorsport Showdown for one season. He also hosted the series Battle of the Supercars (2010) (Speed), Off-Road Overhaul (2011–2012) (Outdoor Channel), and Game Changers (2013) (Stage 5 TV).

In addition to one-offs and occasional appearances, Reherman had recurring acting roles on several television series, including Look: The Series (2010) and The First Family (2012–2013). He was also featured regularly on reality show The Great Escape (2012) as a guard.

Reherman also worked in video games, providing voices for characters in Dead Rising 3 and Ghost Recon Advanced Warfighter. The projects he was working when he died will go on as planned. In 2010, he appeared in a recurring role on the ABC soap opera General Hospital.

Death
Reherman was found dead on March 1, 2016, by his girlfriend Natalina Maggio; she discovered Lee's body at his house in Manhattan Beach, California. No cause of death was specified. Reherman had undergone hip replacement surgery a few weeks earlier. He was survived by his father and two brothers.

Filmography

Film

Television

Video games

References

External links

American Gladiators Hawk Profile (GladiatorsTV.com)

1966 births
2016 deaths
American football offensive linemen
American game show hosts
American male television actors
American male video game actors
American male voice actors
Cornell Big Red football players
Cornell University alumni
UCLA Anderson School of Management alumni
Male actors from Louisville, Kentucky
20th-century American male actors
Players of American football from Louisville, Kentucky
21st-century American male actors
XFL (2001) announcers